Cryptomeigenia is a genus of parasitic flies in the family Tachinidae. Larvae are parasitoids of adult scarab beetles.

Species
C. aurifacies Walton, 1912
C. brimleyi Reinhard, 1947
C. crassipalpis Reinhard, 1947
C. demylus (Walker, 1849)
C. dubia Curran, 1926
C. elegans (Wulp, 1890)
C. flavibasis Curran, 1927
C. hinei (Coquillett, 1902)
C. illinoiensis (Townsend, 1892)
C. longipes (Thompson, 1968)
C. meridionalis (Townsend, 1912)
C. muscoides Curran, 1926
C. nigripes Curran, 1926
C. nigripilosa Curran, 1926
C. ochreigaster Curran, 1926
C. setifacies Brauer & von Bergenstamm, 1891
C. simplex Curran, 1926
C. theutis (Walker, 1849)
C. triangularis Curran, 1926

References

Diptera of North America
Diptera of South America
Exoristinae
Tachinidae genera
Taxa named by Friedrich Moritz Brauer
Taxa named by Julius von Bergenstamm